Nationality words link to articles with information on the nation's poetry or literature (for instance, Irish or France).

Events
 Griffin Poetry Prize is established, with one award given each year for the best work by a Canadian poet and one award given for best work in the English language internationally.
 February — Janice Mirikitani succeeds Lawrence Ferlinghetti as San Francisco's Poet Laureate
 April 17 - New Jersey Governor Christine Todd Whitman appoints poet Gerald Stern to be the first Poet Laureate of New Jersey
 October 3 — Edward Lear's "The Owl and the Pussycat" named Britain's favorite children's poem in a BBC poll
 October 3 — Justin Trudeau quotes from Robert Frost's "Stopping by Woods" at the funeral of his father, former Canadian Prime Minister Pierre Trudeau
 October 4 — National Poetry Day in Great Britain: 300 school children at the Royal Festival Hall along with 4,000 other people nationwide perform Agbabi's "Word," setting a new Guinness World Record for simultaneous mass performance of a poem
 Spike Milligan made an honorary knight
 In the film Pandaemonium, released this year, the lives of William Wordsworth and Samuel Taylor Coleridge, in particular their collaboration on the "Lyrical Ballads," are discussed.

Works published in English
Listed by nation where the work was first published and again by the poet's native land, if different; substantially revised works listed separately:

Australia
 Les Murray:
 Learning Human: Selected Poems, Farrar Straus Giroux, also published as Learning Human, New Selected Poems, Carcanet, 2001shortlisted for the 2001 International Griffin Poetry Prize
 An Absolutely Ordinary Rainbow
 Chris Wallace-Crabbe, The Poems, Brunswick: Gungurru
 Les Wicks, The Ways of Waves, Sidewalk

Canada
 Roo Borson, Introduction to the Introduction to Wang Wei,  (by Pain Not Bread) American-Canadian
 Clint Burnham, Buddyland (Coach House Books) 
 Margaret Christakos:
Wipe Under A Love (Toronto: The Mansfield Press)
Charisma (Toronto: Pedlar Press)
 George Elliott Clarke, Whylah Falls, Vancouver: Polestar, revised edition of book which originally appeared in 1990,  (revised edition number) Canada
 Louis Dudek, The Surface of Time. Montreal: Empyreal.
 Claire Harris, She, Trinidadian-born, Canadian
 Don McKay, Another Gravity (Canada)
 John Pass, Water Stair Canada
 Anne Simpson, Light Falls Through You, winner of the Gerald Lampert Award and the Atlantic Poetry Prize) , Canada
Raymond Souster, Of Time & Toronto. Ottawa: Oberon Press.

Anthologies in Canada
 Ayanna Black, editor, Fiery Spirits & Voices: Canadian Writers of African Descent, Toronto: HarperPerennialCanada
 Wanda Campbell, editor, Susan Atkinson and Tanya Butler, assistant editors, Hidden Rooms: Early Canadian Women Poets, London, Ontario: Canadian Poetry Press
 Sophia Kaszuba, Sian Meikle, and Ian Lancashire, editors, Canadian Poets University of Toronto English Library, including these poets:
Milton Acorn, Margaret Atwood, Margaret Avison, Earle Birney, bill bissett, Marianne Bluger, Stephanie Bolster, Roo Borson, George Bowering, Dionne Brand, Ron Charach, Lesley Choyce, Peter Christensen, Afua Cooper, Don Coles, John Robert Colombo, Lynn Crosbie, Lorna Crozier, Michael Crummey, Jeffery Donaldson, Jennifer Footman, Sky Gilbert, Susan Glickman, Maureen Harris, Elisabeth Harvor, Jan Horner, Susan Ioannou, Ellen Jaffe, Adeena Karasick, Penn Kemp, A. M. Klein, Irving Layton, Noah Leznoff, Dennis Lee, Pat Lowther, Laura Lush, Gwendolyn MacEwen, Kim Maltman, Dave Margoshes, David W. McFadden, Susan McMaster, Bruce Meyer, Anne Michaels, Kim Morrissey, Erín Moure, Susan Musgrave, John Newlove, P. K. Page, E. J. Pratt, Robert Priest, Janis Rapoport, Wayne Scott Ray, Michael Redhill, John Reibetanz, D. C. Reid, Harold Rhenisch, Stan Rogal, Linda Rogers, Joe Rosenblatt, Jay Ruzesky, Richard Sanger, F. R. Scott, Peter Dale Scott, Kathy Shaidle, Kenneth Sherman, Carolyn Smart, Sandy Shreve, John Steffler, Nathalie Stephens, Rosemary Sullivan, Robert Sward, Rhea Tregebov, Jane Urquhart, R. M. Vaughan, Fred Wah, Tom Wayman, Natalie Wilson, Eddy Yanofsky

India, in English
 Sujata Bhatt, Augatora ( Poetry in English ), Carcanet Press
 Keki Daruwalla, Night River ( Poetry in English ), New Delhi: Rupa & Co.
 Ranjit Hoskote, The Cartographer's Apprentice ( Poetry in English ), (with drawings by Laxman Shreshtha), Mumbai: The Pundole Art Gallery
 Tabish Khair, Where Parallel Lines Meet ( Poetry in English ), New Delhi: Penguin-Viking, ; New York City: Allen Lane, 

 Sudeep Sen:
 Almanac, Columbia: University of South Carolina
 Lines of Desire, Columbia: University of South Carolina
 A Blank Letter, Dhaka: The High Commission of India
 K. Satchidanandan, Imperfect and Other New Poems, Kozhikode, Kerala: Olive Publications
 Dilip Chitre, No Moon Monday on the River Karha, Pune: Vijaya Chitre

New Zealand
 Fleur Adcock (New Zealand poet who moved to England in 1963), Poems 1960–2000, Newcastle upon Tyne: Bloodaxe Books
 Nick Ascroft, From the Author Of
 Jenny Bornholdt, These Days
 Glenn Colquhoun, An Explanation of Poetry to My Father
 Paula Green, Chrome
 Murray Edmond, Laminations
 Andrew Johnston, Birds of Europe
 Cilla McQueen, Markings, poetry and drawings, Otago University Press
 Stephanie de Montalk, Animals Indoors, Victoria University Press

Anthologies in New Zealand
 Jenny Bornholdt and Gregory O'Brien, editors, My Heart Goes Swimming: New Zealand Love Poems, Random House New Zealand , 
 Alan Brunton, Murray Edmond, Michele Leggott, editors, Big Smoke: New Zealand Poems 1960–1975, Auckland: Auckland University Press
 Lauris Edmond, editor, New Zealand Love Poems: An Oxford Anthology, posthumous

United Kingdom
 Fleur Adcock (New Zealand poet who moved to England in 1963), Poems 1960–2000, Newcastle upon Tyne: Bloodaxe Books
 Gerry Cambridge, The Praise of Swans (pamphlet, 28 pp), Shoestring Press, 
 Robert Crawford and Mick Imlah, editors, The New Penguin Book of Scottish Verse, London: Allen Lane, Penguin Press (anthology)
 Carol Ann Duffy, The Oldest Girl in the World, Faber and Faber (children's poetry)
 U. A. Fanthorpe, Consequences
 James Fenton: The Strength of Poetry: Oxford Lectures
James Fenton (Ulster Scots poet), Thonner an Thon: an Ulster-Scots collection, Ulster Scots dialect poet living and published in Northern Ireland
 Elaine Feinstein, Gold, Carcanet
 Thom Gunn:
 Boss Cupid
 Collected Poems
 Glyn Maxwell, The Boys at Twilight: Poems, 1990–1995, Houghton Mifflin (a New York Times "notable book of the year"), Briton and poetry editor of The New Republic living in the United States
 Craig Raine, A la Recherche du Temps Perdu
 Peter Reading, Marfan
 Maurice Riordan, Irish poet living and published in the United Kingdom:
 Floods, Faber and Faber
 Editor, with Jon Turney (a science journalist), A Quark for Mister Mark: 101 Poems about Science, anthology, Faber and Faber
 Jo Shapcott, Her Book
 Sulpicia, The Poems of Sulpicia, ancient Roman poet translated by John Heath-Stubbs

United States
 John Ashbery:
 Your Name Here
 As Umbrellas Follow Rain
 Bei Dao, Unlock, English translation by Eliot Weinberger & Iona Man-Cheong (New Directions) 
 Edward Brathwaite, Words Need Love Too, Barbadian poet living in the United States
 Joseph Brodsky: Collected Poems in English, 1972–1999, edited by Ann Kjellberg, New York: Farrar, Straus & Giroux Russian-American; Farrar, Straus & Giroux (a New York Times "notable book of the year")
 Gwendolyn Brooks, In Montgomery
 Anne Carson, Men in the Off Hours, Knopf (a New York Times "notable book of the year")
 Paul Celan, Glottal Stop: 101 Poems by Paul Celan (Translated by Heather McHugh and Nikolai Popov)
 Anita Endreszze, Throwing Fire at the Sun, Water at the Moon, combination of fiction, nonfiction and poetry, Tucson, Arizona: University of Arizona Press
 Michael S. Harper, Songlines in Michaeltree: New and Collected Poems
 Fanny Howe, Fanny Howe: Selected Poems
 Kenneth Koch, New Addresses: Poems, Knopf (a New York Times "notable book of the year")
 Stanley Kunitz, The Collected Poems, Norton (a New York Times "notable book of the year")
 Stanley Lombardo (translator), Odyssey by Homer, Hackett (a New York Times "notable book of the year")
 Glyn Maxwell, The Boys at Twilight: Poems, 1990–1995, Houghton Mifflin (a New York Times "notable book of the year"), Briton and poetry editor of The New Republic living in the United States
 Constance Merritt, A Protocol for Touch: Vassar Miller Prize in Poetry, selected by Eleanor Wilner
 W. S. Merwin, translation, Purgatorio from The Divine Comedy of Dante; New York: Knopf; (a New York Times "notable book of the year")
 Grazyna Miller, Sull'onda del respiro (On the Wave of Breath)
 Michael O'Brien, Sills: Selected Poems, Zoland
 Mary Oliver, The Leaf and the Cloud (prose poem)
 Grace Paley, Begin Again: Collected Poems
 Michael Palmer, The Promises of Glass
 Carl Phillips, Pastoral
 Robert Pinsky, Jersey Rain (Farrar, Straus & Giroux) (a New York Times "notable book of the year")
 Michael Ryan, A Difficult Grace: On Poets, Poetry, and Writing (essays)
 Gjertrud Schnackenberg:
 The Throne of Labdacus, Farrar, Straus & Giroux (a New York Times "notable book of the year")
 Supernatural Love: Poems 1976–1992, 
 Derek Walcott, The Prodigal (West Indian)
 Louis Zukofsky, Wesleyan University Press begins publishing The Wesleyan Centennial Edition of the Complete Critical Writings of Louis Zukofsky (posthumous)

Criticism, scholarship and biography in the United States
 John Ashbery, Other Traditions (Harvard University Press), thoughts on six poets (John Clare, Thomas Lovell Beddoes, Raymond Roussel, John Wheelwright, Laura Riding, and David Schubert); from his Charles Eliot Norton Lectures (criticism)  
 Alison Lurie, Familiar Spirits: A Memoir of James Merrill and David Jackson
 Helen Vendler, Seamus Heaney,

Anthologies in the United States
 Stephen Berg, David Bonanno, and Arthur Vogelsang, editors, The Body Electric, anthology of poetry published in The American Poetry Review, 1972–1999.(W.W. Norton & Company), 820 pages
 American Poetry: The Twentieth Century, two volumes, The Library of America (Henry Adams to May Swenson)
 Cary Nelson, editor, Anthology of Modern American Poetry, Oxford University Press (also published in the United Kingdom)
 Jeffrey Paine, Kwame Anthony Appiah, Sven Birkerts, Joseph Brodsky, Carolyn Forché, and Helen Vendler, editors, The Poetry of Our World: an International Anthology of Contemporary Poetry, New York: HarperCollins

Poets appearing in The Best American Poetry 2000
These 75 poets had poems published in The Best American Poetry 2000, edited by David Lehman, with Rita Dove as guest editor:

Kim Addonizio
Pamela Alexander
A. R. Ammons
Julianna Baggott
Erin Belieu
Richard Blanco
Janet Bowdan
Grace Butcher
Lucille Clifton
Billy Collins
Jim Daniels
Gregory Djanikian
Denise Duhamel
Christopher Edgar

Karl Elder
Lynn Emanuel
B. H. Fairchild
Charles Fort
Frank X. Gaspar
Elton Glaser
Ray Gonzalez
Jennifer Grotz
Thom Gunn
Mark Halliday
Barbara Hamby
Forrest Hamer
Brenda Hillman
Marsha Janson
Mark Jarman

Patricia Spears Jones
Rodney Jones
Donald Justice
Olena Kalytiak Davis
David Kirby
Carolyn Kizer
Lynne Knight
Yusef Komunyakaa
Thomas Lux
Lynne McMahon
W. S. Merwin
Susan Mitchell
Jean Nordhaus
Mary Oliver
Michael Palmer

Paul Perry
Carl Phillips
Robert Pinsky
Donald Platt
Stanley Plumly
Lawrence Raab
Thomas Rabbitt
Mary Jo Salter
Rebecca Seiferle
Brenda Shaughnessy
Laurie Sheck
Reginald Shepherd
Rudy Delgado Jr.
Cathy Song
Gary Soto

Gabriel Spera
A. E. Stallings
Susan Stewart
Adrienne Su
Pamela Sutton
Dorothea Tanning
Natasha Trethewey
Quincy Troupe
Reetika Vazirani
Paul Violi
Derek Walcott
Richard Wilbur
Susan Wood
John Yau
Dean Young

Other in English
 Edward Brathwaite, Words Need Love Too, Barbadian poet living in the United States
 Moya Cannon, Oar, Oldcastle: The Gallery Press,  Ireland
 Claire Harris, She, Trinidadian-born, Canadian

Works published in other languages
Listed by nation where the work was first published and again by the poet's native land, if different; substantially revised works listed separately:

China
 Yang Ke, editor, 2000 Yearbook of New Chinese Poetry (anthology)
 Yu Jian, China:
Shige • Biantiaoji (short poems)
Yu Jian de shi (poems and translations)

Denmark
 Klaus Høeck, fra Hjem, publisher: Gyldendal; Denmark
 Henrik Nordbrandt:
 Drømmebroer ("Dream Bridges"), winner of the Nordic Council's Literature Prize (Denmark)
 Egne digte ("Own Poems"), Copenhagen: Gylendal, 289 pages

French language

Canada, in French
 Denise Desautels, Tombeau de Lou, Montréal: Le Noroît
 Pierre Labrie, À tout hasard
 Madeleine Ouellette-Michalska, L'Amérique un peu/Au bord du rouge absolu, with James Sacré; Montréal: Trait d'union
 Jean Royer, Le visage des mots, Trois-Rivières: Écrits des Forges//Marchainville: Proverbe

France
 Andre du Bouchet, L'emportement du muet
 Seyhmus Dagtekin, Les chemins du nocturne, publisher: Le Castor Astral
 Abdellatif Laabi, Poèmes périssables, La Différence, coll. Clepsydre, Paris (épuisé), Moroccan author writing in French and published in France
 Jean-Claude Pinson, Fado (avec fantomes et flacons)
 Jacqueline Risset, Les instants

India
In each section, listed in alphabetical order by first name:

Bengali
 Joy Goswami:
 Jogotbari, Kolkata: Ananda Publishers, 
 Kabita-Songroho, Vol. 3, Kolkata: Ananda Publishers, 
 Debarati Mitra:
 Tunnur Computer, Kolkata: Ananda Publishers
 Srestha Kavita, Kolkata: Dey's Publishing
 Nirendranath Chakravarti; Bengali-language:
 Shakulley Teenjon, Kolkata: Ananda Publishers
 Joler Jailkhana Theke, Kolkata: Ananda Publishers

Hindi
 Anamika, Kavita Mein Aurat, Delhi: Itihas Bodh
 Teji Grover, Ant Ki Kucch Aur Kavitayen, New Delhi: Vani Prakashan
 Udayan Vajpeyi, Vie Invisible, translated and published in France; Lignon: Cheyne Editeur;

Other in India
 Amarjit Chandan; Punjabi-language:
 Gurhti (in Persian script), Navyug, New Delhi
 Anaran vala Vehra (in Persian script), Kitab Tirinjan, Lahore
 Chandrakant (Chandu) Shah, also known as Chandu Shah, Blue Jeans, Mumbai: Image Publications; Gujarati-language
 Jiban Narah, Ta-Ri-Ri, Guwahati, Assam: Bak; Indian, Assamese-language
 K. Satchidanandan, Sambhashanathinu Oru Sramam, ("An Attempt to Converse"); Malayalam-language
 K. Siva Reddy, Kavisamayam, Vijayawada: Sahiti Mitrulu; Telugu-language
 Kutti Revathi, Poonaiyai pola alaiyum velicham, ("Light Prowls Like a Cat"), Chennai: Thamizhini
 S. Joseph, Karutha Kallu, winner of the Kerala Sahitya Akademi Award; Kottayam: DC Books, 
 Prathibha Nandakumar, Aha! Purushakaram! ("Aha! The Human Form!"), Srirangapattana, Mandya district, Karnataka: Nelamane Prakashana
 Salma, Oru Maalaiyum Innoru Maalaiyum, Nagercoil: Kalachuvadu Pathippagam
 Varavara Rao (better known as "VV"), Unnadedo Unnattu ("As It Is"); Telugu-language

Bangladesh
 Rahman Henry, Prokrito Saros Urey Jae, A Book of Poetry in Bengali, Shraban, Shahbag, Dhaka. Bangladesh.

Poland
 Leszek Engelking, I inne wiersze (And Other Poems) Poland
 Czesław Miłosz, To ("It"); Kraków: Znak
 Eugeniusz Tkaczyszyn-Dycki, Przewodnik dla bezdomnych niezależnie od miejsca zamieszkania
 Jan Twardowski, Elementarz księdza Twardowskiego dla najmłodszego, średniaka i starszego, Kraków: Wydawnictwo Literackie

Serbia

 Dejan Stojanović:
 Znak i njegova deca (The Sign and Its Children), Prosveta, Beograd
 Oblik (The Shape), Gramatik, Podgorica, Montenegro
 Tvoritelj (The Creator), Narodna knjiga–Alfa, Beograd
 Krugovanje (Circling), Third Edition (poems added to the third edition), Narodna knjiga–Alfa, Beograd

Other
 Christoph Buchwald, general editor, and Ludwig Harig, guest editor, Jahrbuch der Lyrik 2001 ("Poetry Yearbook 2001"), publisher: Beck; anthology
 Matilde Camus, Prisma de emociones ("Prism of emotions"), Spain
 Faruk Šehić, Pjesme u Nastajanju ("Acquired Poems"), Bosnia
 Maria Luisa Spaziani, La freccia, Italy
 Yang Ke, editor, 2000 Yearbook of New Chinese Poetry , China (anthology)

Awards and honors

Australia
 C. J. Dennis Prize for Poetry: John Millett, Iceman
 Kenneth Slessor Prize for Poetry: Jennifer Maiden, Mines
 Mary Gilmore Prize: Lucy Dougan, Memory Shell

Canada
 Gerald Lampert Award: Shawna Lemay, All the God-Sized Fruit
 Archibald Lampman Award: Stephanie Bolster, Two Bowls of Milk
 Atlantic Poetry Prize: Ken Babstock, Mean
 2000 Governor General's Awards: Don McKay, Another Gravity (English); Normand de Bellefeuille, La Marche de l'aveugle sans son chien (French)
 Pat Lowther Award: Esta Spalding, Lost August
 Prix Alain-Grandbois: Normand de Bellefeuille, La Marche de l'aveugle sans son chien
 Dorothy Livesay Poetry Prize: Lorna Crozier, What the Living Won't Let Go
 Prix Émile-Nelligan: Tania Langlais, Douze bêtes aux chemises de l'homme

India
 Sahitya Akademi Award : Manglesh Dabral for Hum Jo Dekhte Hain
 Poetry Society India National Poetry Competition : Shahnaz Habib for Of Hypocrisy and Cheekbones & Revathy Gopal for I Would Know You Anywhere

New Zealand
 Prime Minister's Awards for Literary Achievement:
 Montana New Zealand Book Awards (no poetry winner this year):
 First-book award for poetry: Glenn Colquhoun, The Art of Walking Upright, Steele Roberts
 A.W. Reed Lifetime Achievement Award: Allen Curnow

United Kingdom
 Cholmondeley Award: Alistair Elliot, Michael Hamburger, Adrian Henri, Carole Satyamurti
 Eric Gregory Award: Eleanor Margolies, Antony Rowland, Antony Dunn, Karen Goodwin, Clare Pollard
 Forward Poetry Prize Best Collection: Michael Donaghy, Conjure (Picador)
 Forward Poetry Prize Best First Collection: Andrew Waterhouse, In (The Rialto)
 Samuel Johnson Prize: David Cairns, Berlioz: Volume 2
 Queen's Gold Medal for Poetry: Edwin Morgan
 T. S. Eliot Prize (United Kingdom and Ireland): Michael Longley, The Weather in Japan
 Whitbread Award for poetry: John Burnside, The Asylum Dance
 National Poetry Competition : Ian Duhig for The Lammas Hireling

United States
 Agnes Lynch Starrett Poetry Prize awarded to Quan Barry for Asylum
 Aiken Taylor Award for Modern American Poetry, Eleanor Ross Taylor
 Bernard F. Connors Prize for Poetry, Corey Marks, "Renunciation", and (separately) Christopher Patton, "Broken Ground"
 Bobbitt National Prize for Poetry, David Ferry for Of No Country I Know: New and Selected Poems and Translations
 Brittingham Prize in Poetry, Rudy Delgado Jr., A Path Between Houses
 Frost Medal: Anthony Hecht
 National Book Award for poetry: Lucille Clifton, Blessing the Boats: New and Selected Poems 1988–2000
 Poet Laureate Consultant in Poetry to the Library of Congress: Stanley Kunitz appointed
 Poet Laureate of Virginia: Grace Simpson, two year appointment 2000 to 2002
 Pulitzer Prize for Poetry: C.K. Williams, Repair
 Robert Fitzgerald Prosody Award: T. V. F. Brogan
 Ruth Lilly Poetry Prize: Carl Dennis
 Wallace Stevens Award: Frank Bidart
 Whiting Awards: Albert Mobilio, James Thomas Stevens, Claude Wilkinson
 William Carlos Williams Award: Kathleen Peirce, The Oval Hour (Iowa Poetry Prize), Judge: Jean Valentine
 Fellowship of the Academy of American Poets: Lyn Hejinian

Deaths

Birth years link to the corresponding "[year] in poetry" article:
January 2 – Roland Flint, 66 (born 1934), American, of cancer
January 22 – Anne Hébert, 83 (born 1916), Canadian, French language
January 28 – Lauris Edmond, 75 (born 1924), New Zealand
February 4 – Edgar Bowers, 75 (born 1924), American, of non-Hodgkin's lymphoma
April 16 – John Bruce, 78 (born 1922) Canadian
April 21
 Douglas Oliver, 62 (born 1937), English, of prostate cancer
 Al Purdy, 81 (born 1918), Canadian, of lung cancer
May 14 – Karl Shapiro, 86 (born 1913), American
September 25 – R. S. Thomas, 87 (born 1913), Anglo-Welsh poet and clergyman
June 9 – Ernst Jandl, 74 (born 1925), Austrian poet, author and translator
June 26 – Judith Wright, 85 (born 1915) Australian poet and environmental campaigner, of a heart attack
July 13 – A. D. Hope, 92 (born 1907), Australian poet and satirist
September 22 – Yehuda Amichai, 76 (born 1924), Israeli, Hebrew language
November 14 – Libby Scheier, 54 (born 1946), Canadian, of breast cancer
November 29 – William Scammell, 59 (born 1939), English
December 3 – Gwendolyn Brooks, 83 (born 1917), American, of cancer
December 20 – Adrian Henri, 68 (born 1932), English member of the Liverpool poets

References

Notes
"A Timeline of English Poetry" at the Representative Poetry Online website, University of Toronto

See also

Poetry
List of years in poetry
List of poetry awards

2000s in poetry
Poetry